Hemlock Overlook Regional Park is a multi-use park near Clifton, Virginia. The park offers hilly woodlands and floodplain scenery and is a place for hiking. Currently, the park is in passive operations; no programs are offered.

Hemlock Overlook is one of several parks lining Bull Run. Like the others, it is densely forested and full of hilly scenery. It covers 400 acres. Hemlock Overlook is named after the grove of hemlock trees above the banks of the Bull Run in the northern section of the park.

At the northern edge of the park is the site of the Union Mills and the bridge crossing for the Orange and Alexandria Railroad over the Bull Run; both of these sites have high significance in the Battles of Bull Run. The site of a dam that supported the first hydroelectric power generation to Fairfax County is also on the Hemlock Overlook site. A permanent orienteering course, built with the support of the Quantico Orienteering Club, sits in the southern end of the park, below Yates Ford Road and Yates Ford Trail. The Bull Run-Occoquan Trail (blue trail) is maintained by the PATC.

From 1984 to 2009, Hemlock Overlook operated as a university outdoor education center, through a partnership between George Mason University and the Park Authority. At Thanksgiving, the staff conducted "Turkey in the Hole". In 2009, the Park Authority engaged a partner, Adventure Links, to operate the facility.  In 2021, the Park Authority put out a Request for Proposal for prospective new operating partners to submit proposals with a process intending for a new operator to begin programming in 2022. A new RFP was posted November 14, 2022, with a due date of December 16, 2022, for  proposals to start in 2023.

References

External links 

 NOVA Parks website

NOVA Parks
Scenic viewpoints in the United States
Parks in Fairfax County, Virginia
Regional parks in Virginia